Tuzlukush (Tuźlıqıwış) is a rural locality (a selo) and the administrative centre of Tuzlukushevsky Selsoviet, Belebeyevsky District, Bashkortostan, Russia. The population was 335 as of 2010. There are 5 streets.

Geography 
Tuzlukush is located 24 km north of Belebey (the district's administrative centre) by road. Bayrak is the nearest rural locality.

References 

Rural localities in Belebeyevsky District